Filippo Di Marco (born 12 July 1998) is an Italian rugby union player, currently playing for Top10 side Fiamme Oro. He was also a permit player for the Pro14 side Zebre. His preferred position is fly-half.

Zebre
Di Marco was announced as an additional player for Zebre in May 2021. He made his Zebre debut in Round 4 of the Pro14 Rainbow Cup competition against .

International career
In 2017 and 2018 Di Marco was named in the Italy Under 20 squad. On 26 May he was called in Italy A squad for the South African tour in the 2022 mid-year rugby union tests against Namibia and Currie Cup XV team.

References

External links
itsrugby.co.uk Profile

1998 births
Living people
Italian rugby union players
Zebre Parma players
Rugby union fly-halves